Elevation is the height of a geographic location above a fixed reference point.

Elevation  may also refer to:

Math and science
Elevation (ballistics), the angle between a weapon barrel and the horizontal plane
Elevation (astronomy), one component of the horizontal coordinate system
Elevation (view), used in architectural drawing to represent a building facade
Elevation (kinesiology), an anatomical term of motion
Elevation (emotion)
Elevation, a type of semantic change in linguistics

Music
"Elevation" (song), by U2
"Elevation", a song by the American band Television from the album Marquee Moon
"Elevation", a song by Zion I from the album Mind Over Matter
"Elevation", a Dutch trance song composed by Jack Molenschot
"Elevation", a jazz song written by Gerry Mulligan and recorded by Elliot Lawrence
Elevation (Yonder Mountain String Band album), 1999
Elevation (Anggun album), 2008
Elevation (Black Eyed Peas album), 2022
Elevation (Pharoah Sanders album), 1974
Elevation (Lawson Rollins album), 2011
"Elevation", a pop song by English band Erasure, 2014

Other uses
Elevation, New Zealand, a locality in the Marlborough District
Elevation (liturgy), the lifting of consecrated bread and wine in Mass
Elevation (novella), a 2018 novella by Stephen King
Elevation, or privilege escalation, use of a computer security exploit to access protected information or functions
AEW Dark: Elevation, professional wrestling web television program
Elevation (emotion),  an emotion elicited by witnessing acts of moral goodness

See also

Elevated (disambiguation)
Elevator (disambiguation)